Alan Howard may refer to:
 Alan Howard (actor) (1937–2015), English actor
 Alan Howard (cricketer) (1909–1993), English cricketer
 Alan Howard (engineer) (1905–1966), American engineer
 Alan Howard (hedge fund manager) (born 1963), hedge fund manager
 Alan Howard (nutritionist) (1929–2020), English nutritionist
 Alan Howard (dancer) (1931–2003), American ballet dancer, choreographer and teacher
 Alan Howard (Coronation Street)
 Alan Howard (artist), artist; see List of public art in Reading, Berkshire
 Alan Howard (born 1941), English musician, original member of The Tremeloes

See also 
 Gregory Allen Howard (born 1962), American screenwriter